Interfungins are Phellinus isolates with NF-κB inhibitory activities.

References

External links 

 
 

2-Pyrones
Phellinus
Catechols